Banatski Dvor is a village in Serbia. It is situated in the Žitište municipality, in the Central Banat District, Vojvodina province. The village is ethnically mixed and its population numbering 1,263 people (2002 census), including 593 Serbs (46.95%), 509 Hungarians (40.30%), and others.

Name
In Serbian the village is known as Banatski Dvor (Банатски Двор), in Hungarian as Udvarnok (also Törzsudvarnok before 1867, Szőllősudvarnok after 1867, Idvarnok, Itvarnok), and in German as Banater Hof und Rogendorf.

Historical population

1961: 1,832
1971: 1,629
1981: 1,374
1991: 1,300
2001: 1,512
2011: 1,122

Gas depot
There is a large underground gas depot at Banatski Dvor, which will be connected to the proposed South Stream transit gas pipeline.

Gallery

See also
List of places in Serbia
List of cities, towns and villages in Serbia

External links 

Local Community Banatski Dvor (in Serbian)
Banatski Dvor - Večernje Novosti (in Serbian)

References

Slobodan Ćurčić, Broj stanovnika Vojvodine, Novi Sad, 1996.

Populated places in Serbian Banat